John Steven Satterthwaite (11 August 1928 – 23 April 2016) was an Australian bishop in the Catholic Church.

Born in Sydney and educated at St Joseph's College, Hunters Hill, he graduated in engineering at Sydney University while residing at St John's College. He worked as a junior engineer at Australian Iron and Steel, Port Kembla.

Ordained to the priesthood in Rome in 1957, Satterthwaite was named coadjutor bishop of the Roman Catholic Diocese of Lismore, Australia in 1969. He became bishop of the diocese in 1971 and served until he retired in 2001. Satterthwaite died on 23 April 2016.

See also

Notes

1928 births
2016 deaths
20th-century Roman Catholic bishops in Australia
Roman Catholic Diocese of Lismore
People educated at St Joseph's College, Hunters Hill
University of Sydney alumni
Roman Catholic bishops of Lismore